Eva C. “Eve” Ryder (1896–1984) was an artist in Nebraska known for her oil paintings of Midwest landscapes and also for still lifes.  Her works were exhibited at the Joslyn Art Museum in Omaha, Nebraska, as well as in annual exhibitions in Lincoln, Kearney and Grand Island, where she lived.  She was married to Dr. Franklin Dell Ryder, who was a well-known physician in Grand Island, Nebraska.  She studied art under Augustus Dunbier and Lenore Benolken in Omaha, Nebraska, as well as under William A. Patty in California.

References

1896 births
1984 deaths
20th-century American painters
Artists from Nebraska
20th-century American women artists
People from Grand Island, Nebraska